Brett William McConnachie (born March 1, 1985) is a Canadian professional hockey right winger who plays for the Hamilton Steelhawks.

Early life
He was born on March 1, 1985, in Ajax, Ontario, Canada.

Education
McConnachie graduated from the University of Alabama–Huntsville in 2007 with a Bachelor of Science degree in business administration.

Hockey career
McConnachie's hockey career spans over two decades, in which he played for the University of Alabama-Huntsville, Tulsa Oilers, Fayetteville FireAntz, and Whitby Dunlops, among others. He started his career by playing junior hockey in 2000. In 2001, he was drafted in the 4th round by the Toronto St. Michael's Majors of the Ontario Hockey League (OHL), placing 76th overall.

From 2001 to 2022, he played for Ajax Axemen, and in the following year, he played for the Wexford Raiders. The Russian under-20 team was traveling throughout Canada that year. During a match with that team, he drew the coaching staff's attention from the University of Alabama-Huntsville (UAH) and went to study there on a hockey scholarship. Over the next four years at UAH, he proved to be a valuable addition to the team. UAH qualified for the NCAA tournament in McConnachie's senior year.

After graduating, he spent some time playing for various teams, and his pro career did not start as smoothly. In 2009, they lost seven of the President's cup finals. In the same year, his big professional break came when he joined FireAntz in 2009.

McConnachie received a full four-year NCAA Division I scholarship to play at the University of Alabama-Huntsville.

Music
McConnachie took piano lessons as a child. He has recorded four albums. He is also known as Bowx.

He released several albums in college, including Triple Threat, Back 4 More, and Rhythm and Bowx.

McConnachie continued to play with the Whitby Dunlops until 2020 in his hometown. He was co-coaching while also working as a part-time trainer.

Discography
Albums:

Triple Threat (2002)
Back 4 More (2003)
Rhythm & Bowx (2005)
Now Or Never (2007)
The Tussin Mixtape (2009)
Ya Gotta LP (2011)

References

Living people
1985 births
Canadian ice hockey players
People from Ajax, Ontario
University of Alabama in Huntsville alumni